Movencorp also referred to as Moven, is a fintech company working with banks, credit unions and fintechs.

History
Moven was co-founded in 2011 by Brett King, author of the Bank 2.0, Bank 3.0 and Bank 4.0 books and others. 

In August 2012, Moven announced that it had closed a $2.4 million seed investment round, funded by Moven's founders, Anthemis Group, Raptor Ventures, Kevin Plank (CEO of Under Armour), and a syndicate of Singaporean investors.  In 2013, a fintech VC fund Life.SREDA invested $2 million in the Movenbank. Also in 2013, Moven launched its mobile banking and mobile payment services.

In 2020, Moven closed its Neobank operations to refocus its efforts on white label B2B efforts with financial institutions and fintechs. The company continues to operate as a digital banking and financial technology application developer, providing financial institutions and fintechs with APIs and SDKs.

in 2021 a new management team was formed with Richard Radice transitioning to CEO and  fintech veteran Bryan Clagett, joining as CRO.

Media coverage
Moven has been featured in American Banker, BetaKit, BRW, and PSFK.

Brett King also hosts the #1 Fintech radio show and podcast Breaking Banks.

References 

2011 establishments in the United States
Financial services companies established in 2011
Financial services companies of the United States
Companies established in 2011